Pterostylis cucullata, commonly known as the leafy greenhood, is a plant in the orchid family Orchidaceae and is endemic to south-eastern Australia. It has a rosette of fleshy leaves at its base and a single white, green and reddish-brown flower.

Description
Pterostylis cucullata, is a terrestrial,  perennial, deciduous, herb with an underground tuber. It has between four and seven egg-shaped to oblong leaves, some of which form a rosette at the base and some partly wrap around the flowering stem. The dorsal sepal and petals are joined and curve forward in a semi-circle, forming a hood called the "galea" over the column. There is a wide gap at each side of the flower between the petals and the lateral sepals. Flowering occurs from August to October.

Taxonomy and naming
Pterostylis cucullata was first formally described in 1810 by Robert Brown and the description was published in Prodromus Florae Novae Hollandiae et Insulae Van Diemen. The specific epithet (cucullata) is derived from the Latin word cucullus meaning "cap", or "hood".

There are two subspecies, differing mainly in the height of the flowering stem:

Distribution and habitat
The leafy greenhood is widely distributed in Victoria, South Australia and Tasmania but only in small, isolated populations. Both subspecies are present in Victoria as small groups in coastal areas and inland watercourses. It grows in shady forest slopes in South Australia but is very rare there. It is extinct on the main island of Tasmania and King Island, presently found only on Hunter Island and Three Hummock Island in Bass Strait.

Conservation
Pterostylis cucullata is listed as  "vulnerable" under the Australian Government Environment Protection and Biodiversity Conservation Act 1999. The main threats to the species are habitat loss and disturbance, weed invasion and grazing by rabbits, hares and snails.

References

cucullata
Endemic orchids of Australia
Orchids of South Australia
Orchids of Tasmania
Orchids of Victoria (Australia)
Plants described in 1810